Jinbu-myeon is a myeon (township) in Pyeongchang county of Gangwon-do South Korea. The myeon is located in northern central part of the county. The total area of Bongpyeong-myeon is 331.14 square kilometers, and, as of 2008, the population was 10,203 people.

History 
Jinbu is a small rural township located within the Odaesan National Park and has been a place of solitude, serenity, peace and quaintness since royal times. Just nearby is Woljeongsa, a temple complex built in 643 by Jajang, a monk from Silla and activates as head temple of the Jogye Order.

Places of interest 

 Woljeongsa
 Sangwonsa
 Gariwangsan
 Odaesan

References 

Pyeongchang County
Towns and townships in Gangwon Province, South Korea